David James Mackay (born 25 March 1959) is a New Zealand sailor. He competed in the Flying Dutchman event at the 1984 Summer Olympics.

References

External links
 

1959 births
Living people
New Zealand male sailors (sport)
Olympic sailors of New Zealand
Sailors at the 1984 Summer Olympics – Flying Dutchman
Sportspeople from Auckland